

World Cup Singles
The World Cup Singles was an event inaugurated in 2005 by the organisation known as World Bowls and was held until 2019. It was contested annually between bowlers from national bowls organisations. The competition was seen as the Southern Hemisphere equivalent of the World Indoor Bowls Championships held annually in the United Kingdom and organised by the World Bowls Tour.

The event was first held from 3-10 April 2005, at the Hong Kong Football Club indoor bowling green and Ap Lei Chau Sports Centre in Hong Kong but eventually took place every year at the Warilla Bowls Club in New South Wales, Australia. 

Although players from both hemispheres were able to compete, travelling restricted the entries and the majority of the leading indoor players from the Northern hemisphere did not take part.

In 2019, World Bowls came to an agreement with the International Indoor Bowls Council (IIBC), formerly the WIBC. The agreement was to merge their two international indoor championships, the World Cup Singles and the IIBC Championships. The new event would be called the World Bowls Indoor Championships.

Past winners

Men's singles

Women's singles

See also
World Bowls Events

References

Bowls competitions